Naliya Cantonment railway station is a small railway station in Kutch district, Gujarat. Its code is NLC. It serves Naliya Air Force Station, 6 km south of Naliya village. The station consists of 1 platform. It is next to last station on western side of India, the last being Naliya railway station.

Naliya Cantonment had a metre-gauge railway line laid in 1980 to get connected with the town of Bhuj. The line was abandoned later since Gandhidham–Bhuj section got converted to broad gauge and this 101.24 km line became isolated. Recently, conversion to broad gauge has been approved by the Government of India in June 2016, so that it can be used for public, military or freight purpose. In 2018 the railway section between Bhuj and Deshalpur village (28 km) was commissioned, remaining under gauge conversion Deshalpur–Naliya section (74 km).

Bhuj – Naliya railway line is classified as being of strategic importance, because of its proximity to the border with Pakistan and Naliya Air Force Station.

There is a project to extend the line up to Vayor village, 25 km northwest of Naliya.

References

Railway stations in Kutch district
Ahmedabad railway division